Mason Jennings is the first studio album by Mason Jennings.

Critical reception
AllMusic called the album "an amazingly realized work. A distinct sound and vocal style is evident, and there's not one clunker on this entire disc."

Track listing 
 "Nothing" - 3:02
 "Butterfly" - 2:09
 "California" - 3:40
 "Godless" - 2:14
 "Big Sur" - 6:21
 "California [Part II]" - 3:04
 "1997" - 2:32
 "Darkness Between the Fireflies" - 3:00

References

1997 debut albums
Mason Jennings albums